Basilicata Coast to Coast is a 2010 Italian comedy film directed by Rocco Papaleo.

A South Korean remake named Blue Busking was released in 2017.

Plot 
Nicola Palmieri (Rocco Papaleo) is a high school math teacher with a passion for music. He is the frontman of a local music band he formed with a group of friends from Maratea. Guitarist Salvatore Chiarelli (Paolo Briguglia) is a medical student who has somehow forgotten to graduate and fall in love; double bass player Franco Cardillo (Max Gazzè) is a fisherman at whom love has taken away word and purpose in life; drummer Rocco Santamaria (Alessandro Gassman), Salvatore's cousin, is a TV personality whose popularity is declining and hasn't been able to find a showbiz job in the last two years.

During the Summer, the quartet decides to sign up for the national theater-song festival in Scanzano Jonico, renaming themselves "Le Pale Eoliche" (the windmill blades). To get from Maratea to Scanzano Jonico, they need to cross Basilicata from its coast on the Tyrrhenian Sea to the one on the Ionian Sea. Nothing peculiar about this, with a little over 100 km to drive through in about one hour. That's when Nicola suggests leaving 10 days earlier and on foot, trying to find a purpose in life which they've lost.

They set themselves on to a picaresque trip, followed by a local church TV crew along with bored local journalist Tropea Limongi (Giovanna Mezzogiorno), daughter of a renowned local politician. During their long trek, the group walks through little-known backroads, with only a small wagon pulled by a white horse to transport supplies, instruments and two tents. They also rehearse the songs they will be performing at the festival, with impromptu concerts in the small villages they walk by.

This journey will prove therapeutic for everybody: Salvatore finds the willpower to complete medical school; Rocco finds a normal job; Franco starts talking again, uncovering a deep feeling towards Tropea in the meantime; Nicola finally completes one of his projects, showing his wife that he can be an assertive man.

Cast 
 Rocco Papaleo - Nicola Palmieri
 Alessandro Gassman - Rocco Santamaria
 Paolo Briguglia - Salvatore Chiarelli
 Max Gazzè - Franco Cardillo
 Michela Andreozzi - Lucia
 Giovanna Mezzogiorno - Tropea Limongi
 Claudia Potenza - Maria Teresa
 Gaetano Amato - Onorevole Limongi
 Antonio Gerardi - Carmine Crocco
 Augusto Fornari - Press Agent
 Antonio Andrisani - Prete

References

External links 

2010 films
2010 comedy films
Films set in Basilicata
Italian comedy films
2010 directorial debut films
2010s Italian films
Films about street performance